was a Japanese serial killer and fraudster. While engaging in confidence scams, Akira murdered two people, was put on the most wanted list, and killed three others while escaping. The police also regretted that they didn't find Akira, who was found by an 11-year-old girl. A prosecutor called him "the Black Gold Medalist in history". Ryuzo Saki published a book about Akira, which became the basis for the film Vengeance Is Mine. His crimes were the direct catalyst for the creation of the Japanese "Metropolitan Designated Case" system

See also
List of serial killers by country

References

External links 
 Article on the serial murders

1925 births
1970 deaths
20th-century executions by Japan
Executed Japanese people
Executed Japanese serial killers
Japanese fraudsters
Japanese people convicted of murder
Male serial killers
People convicted of murder by Japan
People executed by Japan by hanging
People from Osaka Prefecture